Raffaele Cappelli  (23 March 1848 – 1 June 1921) was an Italian politician and diplomat. He was born in San Demetrio ne' Vestini, Province of L'Aquila, Abruzzo.

Honors 
 Grand Officer of Saints Maurice and Lazarus - 23 March 1911

See also 
 Ministry of Foreign Affairs (Italy)
 Foreign relations of Italy

References

20th-century Italian diplomats
19th-century Italian diplomats
1848 births
1921 deaths
People from the Province of L'Aquila
Deputies of Legislature XIV of the Kingdom of Italy
Deputies of Legislature XV of the Kingdom of Italy
Deputies of Legislature XVI of the Kingdom of Italy
Deputies of Legislature XVII of the Kingdom of Italy
Deputies of Legislature XVIII of the Kingdom of Italy
Deputies of Legislature XIX of the Kingdom of Italy
Deputies of Legislature XX of the Kingdom of Italy
Deputies of Legislature XXI of the Kingdom of Italy
Deputies of Legislature XXII of the Kingdom of Italy
Deputies of Legislature XXIII of the Kingdom of Italy